, is a Japanese Nurse leader and educator. She has been working to advance nursing in Japan, including education, service, and research for more than 30 years.

Early life 
Minami was born in Kobe in 1942 and grew up in Kōchi Prefecture.

Career 
Minami started her career as a staff nurse and then moved to a faculty position. She was the first nurse appointed the president of an independent public college, the College of Nursing Art and Science, Hyogo. She was a member of several committees and councils in the Ministry of Health and the Ministry of Education where she developed health and nursing education policies. She was the 25th president of the International Council of Nurses from 2005 until 2009 and the World Health Organization Global Advisory Group on Nursing/Midwifery. She also served as the president of the Japanese Nursing Association from 1999 until 2005.

References

External links 
 Grant-in-Aid for Scientific Research
 国際看護師協会
 高知県立大学
 高野山医療フォーラム 

Japanese nurses
Florence Nightingale Medal recipients
People from Kōchi Prefecture
Hebrew University-Hadassah Braun School of Public Health and Community Medicine alumni
University of California, San Francisco alumni
1942 births
Living people
International Council of Nurses
Women nurses
People from Kobe